The UGM-89 Perseus was a proposed U.S. Navy submarine-launched anti-ship (AShM) and anti-submarine (ASW) cruise missile that was developed under the Submarine Tactical Missile (STAM) project, which was also referred to as the Submarine Anti-ship Weapon System (STAWS).  This missile system was to be the centerpiece for a proposed third-generation nuclear-powered cruise missile submarine championed by then-Vice Admiral Hyman G. Rickover, the influential but controversial head of the Navy's nuclear propulsion program.

Development
The Navy issued the STAM requirement in March 1969, and the Lockheed Missiles and Space Company (LMSC) responded to this proposal, which included the formation of an undersea warfare program organization in Sunnyvale, California.  It is unclear if this was to be an entirely new organization or part of the Lockheed Underwater Missile Facility (LUMF) which had been responsible for the design and development of the Polaris, Poseidon, and Trident submarine-launched strategic ballistic missile (SLBM) systems for the U.S. Navy.  In February 1970, the missile designation ZUGM-89A Perseus was reserved for the U.S. Navy presumably for the STAM/STAWS missile development program.

Design overview
Because of its large size, the UGM-89 Perseus missile could not be launched from the Navy's standard  submarine torpedo tubes, but would be carried in a vertical launch system (VLS) housed within the proposed cruise missile submarine's hull. Twenty VLS tubes would be located in a separate compartment situated between the submarine's operations and reactor compartments.  The individual launcher tube would be  in dimension.  The missile warhead payload would be a new 21-inch (533 mm) diameter homing torpedo to be developed concurrently with the UGM-89 Perseus missile.

By 1971, the STAM project had evolved into a long-range advanced cruise missile (ACM) program capable of undertaking a variety of combat missions, including strategic nuclear strike (see table below).  The proposed ACM versions of the UGM-89 Perseus STAM would use a slightly enlarged launch tube (and 1979 would have been the date for its initial operational capability (IOC).

Cancellation
The UGM-89 Perseus missile system was cancelled in 1973, and its proposed nuclear-powered cruise missile submarine platform was officially cancelled in 1974, with the Navy deciding to build the less expensive Los Angeles-class nuclear-powered attack submarines, which would subsequently carry both the Harpoon and Tomahawk cruise missiles. The ASW component of the UGM-89 Perseus would later serve as the baseline for the proposed Sea Lance stand-off ASW missile system, which would also be cancelled.

See also
 BGM-109 Tomahawk
 RUR-5 ASROC
 UGM-84 Harpoon
 UUM-44 SUBROC
 UUM-125 Sea Lance

Notes

References

External links
UGM-89 Perseus - Directory of US Military Rockets and Missiles
UGM-89 Perseus - Harpoon series
UGM-89 Perseus - Encyclopedia Astronautica
Missile Design Series - GlobalSecurity.org
"Lockheed's Tactical Undersea Missile" - Flight International - May 29, 1969

Abandoned military rocket and missile projects of the United States
Naval guided missile launch systems of the United States
Cold War anti-submarine weapons of the United States
Cold War anti-ship missiles of the United States
Cruise missiles of the United States
Anti-submarine missiles of the United States
Lockheed Corporation